Camp Rhododendron, also known as Camp Rhododendron Recreational Historic District, is a historic Civilian Conservation Corps camp and national historic district located at Cooper's Rock State Forest near Morgantown, Monongalia County, West Virginia. The district includes seven contributing buildings, one contributing structure, and two contributing objects.  It was constructed between 1936 and 1942, and includes a pumphouse, Robert Fechner Monument, information booth, three pavilions, an overlook / walkway, concession stand, fire warning sign, and trail chalet.  They are built of hewn logs and sandstone and representative of the Depression-era Rustic style of architecture.  Located nearby is the Cooper's Rock State Forest Superintendent's House and Garage, also built by the CCC.

It was listed on the National Register of Historic Places in 1991.

References

1942 establishments in West Virginia
Buildings and structures in Monongalia County, West Virginia
Civilian Conservation Corps camps
Civilian Conservation Corps in West Virginia
National Register of Historic Places in Monongalia County, West Virginia
Historic districts in Monongalia County, West Virginia
Rustic architecture in West Virginia
Rhododendron
Historic districts on the National Register of Historic Places in West Virginia
Temporary populated places on the National Register of Historic Places
National Park Service Rustic architecture